L'Orfeo Barockorchester is an Austrian Ensemble of historically informed performance.

Presentation 
The international baroque and opera orchestra, founded in 1996 by Michi Gaigg and Carin van Heerden at the Anton Bruckner Privatuniversität, has received several awards for first recordings. The repertoire, as can be seen from the discography, ranges from Suites of the French Baroque music through the Sinfonia of the Sturm und Drang to the literature of the Klassik and the Romantic music.

Works 
Most of the operas listed below were staged and performed during the :
 Georg Philipp Telemann: Miriways
 Wolfgang Amadeus Mozart: La Betulia liberata
 Christoph Willibald Gluck: Orfeo ed Euridice
 Gioachino Rossini: La cambiale di matrimonio
 Georg Philipp Telemann: Orpheus oder Die wunderbare Beständigkeit der Liebe
 Gioachino Rossini: La scala di seta
 Joseph Haydn: L'isola disabitata
 Joseph Haydn: L’incontro improvviso
 Gioachino Rossini: Il signor Bruschino
 Georg Anton Benda: Romeo und Julie
 Wolfgang Amadeus Mozart: Zaide
 Georg Philipp Telemann: Don Quichotte auf der Hochzeit des Comacho
 Ignaz Holzbauer: Il Figlio delle Selve (Der Sohn der Wildnis)

Recordings 
The discography for the period 1997 to 2012 comprises about 20 recordings of works by well-known composers of the genre.
 Georg Christoph Wagenseil: Sinfonien
 Benedikt Anton Aufschnaiter: Serenaden aus Concors discoria op. 2
 Ignaz Holzbauer: Sinfonien
 Johann Christian Bach: Geistliche Konzerte. With Emma Kirkby (soprano) and Markus Schäfer (tenor).
 Anton Fils: Sinfonien
 Wolfgang Amadeus Mozart: Konzertarien für Tenor. With Christoph Prégardien.
 Leopold Mozart: Sinfonien
 Georg Philipp Telemann: Sämtliche Violinkonzerte Vol. 1, 2 & 4. with Elizabeth Wallfisch.
 Josef Mysliveček: Sinfonien und Ouvertüren
 Ludwig van Beethoven: Mödlinger Tänze – Kontretänze – Deutsche Tänze – Menuette
 Johann Caspar Ferdinand Fischer: Le Journal du Printemps op. 1
 Jean-Féry Rebel, Les Éléments – Jean-Philippe Rameau: Suite aus Castor et Pollux
 Georg Philipp Telemann: 3 Orchestersuiten. With Carin van Heerden (Blockflöte und Leitung),
 Joseph Haydn: Arie per un'amante mit Nuria Rial and Margot Oitzinger. Deutsche Harmonia Mundi.
 Josef Myslivecek: Sämtliche Bläseroktette und -quintette
 Joseph Haydn: Die wüste Insel, Spätfassung der Azione teatrale L'isola disabitata. Deutsche Harmonia Mundi.
 Christoph Willibald Gluck: Sinfonien
 Jean-Philippe Rameau: Orchestersuiten aus Zaïs & Hippolyte et Aricie
 Georg Philipp Telemann: 3 Ouvertürensuiten für Violine solo und Orchester. With  Elizabeth Wallfisch.
 Franz Schubert: Konzertouvertüren, Sinfonie Nr. 5
 Georg Philipp Telemann: Arien und weltliche Kantaten. Mit Dorothee Mields (Sopran).

Awards 
The orchestra can point to a number of awards:
 Diapason
 Pizzicato-Magazin (Supersonic Award)
 Le Monde de la Musique
 Fono Forum
 Radio Österreich 1 (Pasticcio-Preis)
 Deutsche Phonoakademie (Echo Klassik 2009)

Stationen 
 Festspielhaus Baden-Baden
 Palau de la Música Catalana
 Donaufestwochen in Grein
 Haydn Festspiele in Eisenstadt
 Innsbrucker Festwochen der Alten Musik
 Kölner Philharmonie
 Lucerne Festival
 Festspiele Europäische Wochen Passau
 Tage Alter Musik Regensburg
 Salzburger Festspiele
 Theater an der Wien

See also 
 L'arpa festante
 Michi Gaigg

Further reading 
Reviews of the CD recordings are regularly printed in the trade press and daily newspapers.

Media 
 20 Jahre L'Orfeo Barockorchester. In: Webpräsenz von ORF Radio Oberösterreich

References

External links 
 
 Discogs artist
 

Early music orchestras
Austrian orchestras